Sarotorna is a genus of moths in the family Gelechiidae.

Species
Sarotorna epipona (Meyrick, 1902)
Sarotorna eridora Meyrick, 1904
Sarotorna mesoleuca (Lower, 1900)
Sarotorna myrrhina Turner, 1919
Sarotorna stenodes (Turner, 1936)

References

 
Gelechiini